The Pennsylvania Department of State is a cabinet-level state agency in the Commonwealth of Pennsylvania. The department is headed by the secretary of the Commonwealth of Pennsylvania.

Responsibilities 
Campaign finance reporting
Charities
Corporations
Professional Licenses
Commissions
Elections
Legislation
Statewide Uniform Registry of Electors (SURE)
Lobbying disclosure
Notaries

See also
Government of Pennsylvania
List of Pennsylvania state agencies

References

State agencies of Pennsylvania
Government of Pennsylvania
1919 establishments in Pennsylvania
Government agencies established in 1919